Henderson Field  is a public airport located one mile (2 km) southwest of the central business district (CBD) of Wallace, a town in Duplin County, North Carolina, USA.

Although most U.S. airports use the same three-letter location identifier for the FAA and IATA, Henderson Field is assigned ACZ by the FAA but has no designation from the IATA (which assigned ACZ to Zabol, Iran). The airport's ICAO identifier is KACZ.

References

External links 
  at North Carolina DOT airport guide
 
 

Airports in North Carolina
Buildings and structures in Duplin County, North Carolina
Transportation in Duplin County, North Carolina